Kamjan (also Romanized as Kamjān; also known as Gom Jān) is a village in Dehqanan Rural District, in the Central District of Kharameh County, Fars Province, Iran. At the 2006 census, its population was 1,871, in 478 families.

References 

Populated places in Kharameh County